Santiago do Cacém ( or ) is a municipality in Setúbal District in Portugal. The population in 2011 was 29,749, in an area of 1059.69 km2.

The present mayor is Álvaro Beijinha, elected by the Unitary Democratic Coalition. The municipal holiday is July 25.

Places of interest
Harmonia Society
Park Rio da Figueira
Miróbriga Ruins
Castelo de Santiago do Cacém
Santiago do Cacém Railway Station

Parishes
Administratively, the municipality is divided into eight civil parishes (freguesias):
 Abela
 Alvalade
 Cercal do Alentejo
 Ermidas-Sado
 Santiago do Cacém, Santa Cruz e São Bartolomeu da Serra
 Santo André
 São Domingos e Vale de Água
 São Francisco da Serra

Climate

Gallery

International relations

Santiago do Cacém is twinned with:
  Santiago de Compostela, Spain

Notable people 
 Martim Soares Moreno (ca.1586 in Santiago do Cacém - ca.1648) an explorer in the colony of Brazil
 Manuel da Fonseca (1911 in Santiago do Cacém – 1993) a Portuguese writer
 Silvino Gomes Soares (born 1978 in Santiago do Cacém) a Cape Verdean footballer.
 Alberto Louzeiro (born 1982 in Santiago do Cacém) a Portuguese footballer with over 250 club caps 
 Aurea Sousa (born 1987 in Santiago do Cacém) known as Aurea, a soul, blues, pop, reggae and R&B singer

References

External links

Town Hall official website
Photos from Santiago do Cacém

 
Cities in Portugal
Populated places in Setúbal District
Municipalities of Setúbal District